Shadforth is a village in County Durham, England. It is situated a few miles to the east of Durham. The historic centre of the village is designated a conservation area. The population of the civil parish taken at the 2011 census was 2118.

Shadforth is also a civil parish that also incorporates Ludworth and Sherburn Hill.

History
Shadforth was a farming village from around AD 600. The village is mentioned in the Boldon Book of 1183. It is perhaps the only village in England with the name 'Shadforth' meaning 'Shallow Ford’. Shadforth is unusual in that it has never had its own pit in an area where mining was a large part of the community.

References

External links
 Shadforth Plough Pub & Restaurant

Villages in County Durham